SPARQL Syntax Expressions (alternatively, SPARQL S-Expressions) is a parse tree (a.k.a. concrete syntax) for representing SPARQL Algebra expressions.

Application 
They have been used to apply the BERT language model to create SPARQL queries from natural language questions.

External links 
 SPARQL Algebra in the W3C SPARQL Query Specification
 SPARQL Syntax Expressions in the ARQ query engine
 SPARQL Validator that can also print the Algebra expressions
 SPARQL Syntax Expressions translations of the DAWG test suite

References 

SPARQL
RDF data access